Skinlab is an American heavy metal band formed in 1994 in San Francisco, California by vocalist/bassist Steev Esquivel (who used to sing in the Bay Area thrash metal band Defiance), guitarist Mike Roberts (now with San Francisco Bay Area's RAZE the STRAY), guitarist Gary Wendt (who played for the Bay Area thrash band Sacrilege B.C. and currently fronts The Ghost Next Door), and drummer Paul Hopkins.

History
After releasing three full-length studio albums and an EP, they disbanded in 2003 following the departure of two core members.

Following the band's demise, vocalist/bassist Steev Esquivel and guitarist Steve "Snake" Green went on to form Re:Ignition. The band's debut album, Empty Heart, Loaded Gun, was released in November 2006 through Corporate Punishment Records.

After a three-year hiatus, the band featuring line-up of Steev Esquivel, Snake, Glen Telford and Paul Hopkins had reformed and were rehearsing with plans for a new album in 2009.

Following the 2009 release of Skinlab's album, The Scars Between Us, which according to Esquivel, performed badly sales-wise, guitarist Glenny Telford once again left the band. He was replaced by Brian Jackson (formerly of the Las Vegas band Kreep). As of June 2011, Ex-Rikets guitarist Provo took over guitar duties opposite Snake. Having failed to produce any new material, Skinlab has disbanded.

On September 22, 2016, it was announced that Steev Esquivel and Paul Hopkins had reformed Skinlab, with former members Mike Roberts and Gary Wendt returning to the band as well. The band would perform their debut album in full at various shows in late 2016.

Members

Current members
 Steev Esquivel – vocals, bass guitar (1994–2011, 2016–present)
 Marcos Medina Rivera – guitar (2018–present)
 Fabian Vastod – drums (2019–present)

Former members 
 Paul Hopkins – drums (1994–2011, 2016–2019)
 Mike Roberts – guitar (1994–1998, 2010, 2016–2018)
 Gary Wendt – guitar (1995–1997, 2016–2018)
 Mike Cadoo - guitar
 Steve "Snake" Green – guitar, backing vocals (1998–2011, 2018–2021)
 Scott Sargeant – guitar (1998–2003)
 Glenny Telford – guitar, backing vocals (2003, 2006–2009; died 2018)
 Adam Albright – guitar (2007)
 Brian Jackson – guitar (2009)
 Julian Peach – guitar (2010–2011)
 Provo – guitar (2011)
 Jason Wolfe – guitar (2012)

Discography

Studio albums
 Bound, Gagged and Blindfolded (Century Media, 1997)
 Disembody: The New Flesh (Century Media, 1999)
 ReVoltingRoom (Century Media, 2002)
 The Scars Between Us (Stand and Deliver Records, 2009)
 Venomous (2019)
Other releases
 Eyesore (Century Media, 1998)
 Nerve Damage (Century Media, 2004)
 Skinned Alive (BCD Music, 2008)
Demos
 Circle of Vengeance (self-released, 1995)
 Suffer (self-released, 1996)
 1997 Demo (self-released, 1997)

References

External links 
Official website
Official Facebook page

Nu metal musical groups from California
American groove metal musical groups
Musical groups established in 1995
Musical quartets